The Moore Hollow Group is a geologic group in Texas. It preserves fossils dating back to the Cambrian period.

See also

 List of fossiliferous stratigraphic units in Texas
 Paleontology in Texas

References
 

Cambrian Texas